Kelly Steven Blatz (born June 16, 1987) is an American actor, director, writer, producer, editor and musician. He is best known for playing the lead role in Aaron Stone.

Career
Blatz made his acting debut in Simon Says (2006), then appeared in The 7 (2006), then in the 2008 remake of Prom Night with Brittany Snow and Idris Elba. The same year he went on to play the psychopathic son of a preacher in Phedon Papamichael's intense thriller From Within with Thomas Dekker and Jared Harris, which premiered at the Tribeca Film Festival. In 2009, Blatz played the lead in the independent feature film April Showers, based on the Columbine shootings. He has since become known for his role as Aaron Stone in the Disney XD television show. In 2010, TBS cast him as the lead in their first hour-long comedy, Glory Daze. In 2012 he starred in the film Lost Angeles, where he played a homeless convict who gets caught up in the world of paparazzi.

In 2014, he was cast as the lead role in Marcus Nispel's Exeter. Following that, he starred in Charles Olivier Michaud's drama 4 Minute Mile alongside Richard Jenkins, Kim Basinger, and Analeigh Tipton. He played Drew Jacobs, a talented high school runner who is mentored by his neighbor (Jenkins) to escape a life of drugs alongside his brother (Cam Gigandet). Gary Goldstein of the Los Angeles Times called Blatz's performance "so deep and affecting it often evokes Timothy Hutton's Oscar-winning turn in "Ordinary People".  The film premiered at the Seattle International Film Festival in June, 2014.

He was cast as the role of Brandon in the second season of AMC's  Fear the Walking Dead in 2016. He also played John Wilkes Booth in NBC's new series Timeless.

He starred in the horror film Hex set in Cambodia and co-starring Jenny Boyd and Ross McCall. In 2019, he starred in the psychological thriller Sinister Savior which premiered on Lifetime.

In 2020, he starred opposite Jacqueline Bisset in the film Loren & Rose, written and directed by Russell Brown. He plays Loren, a promising young filmmaker who develops a friendship with an iconic actress.

Directing

In 2015 he directed a series of short documentaries on numerous artists in Los Angeles. In that same year he co-directed, edited and starred in a narrative short film titled "The Stairs" co-starring Anthony Heald. The film was nominated for the Jury Prize for best short film at the Palm Beach International Film Festival and won the Jim Teece Audience Award for best short film at the 2016 Ashland Independent Film Festival and the Special Jury Prize at the 2016 River's Edge International Film Festival.

He directed, co-wrote, produced and edited his first feature film titled Senior Love Triangle based on the award-winning documentary photo series by Isadora Kosofsky featured in TIME magazine. The film stars Tom Bower, Marlyn Mason and Anne Gee Byrd, and follows the romance between three senior citizens in East Hollywood. The film premiered at the 2019 Rhode Island Film Festival and went on to play at over twenty festivals, receiving numerous awards including Best Feature and Best Writing at Breckenridge Film Festival and Best Feature at Syracuse International Film Festival and Defy Film Festival. It was showcased at Newfilmmakers Los Angeles' October 2019 program and was nominated for Best Feature Film of the year. It was acquired by Gravitas Ventures and was released on August 4, 2020 to very positive reviews. The film has an approval rating of 100% on the review aggregator website Rotten Tomatoes.

Music
Blatz was the lead singer in the band Capra for seven years, releasing three albums and playing in numerous Los Angeles venues including The Viper Room and The House of Blues. After signing to Hollywood Records, the band's first single "Low Day" was featured in the movie "Skyrunners" which Blatz also starred in. "Low Day" was also featured in a national Expedia commercial and Guitar Hero 5. The band made a record with producer Matt Wallace. Before the record came out, Blatz left the band due to differences.

In 2011, he took a year off from acting to record two solo albums, Black Box and White Noise, under the name Scott Kid. They were released six months apart on iTunes and Spotify.

Filmography

Awards and nominations

References

External links
 
 
 

1987 births
Living people
21st-century American male actors
American male film actors
American male television actors
Male actors from Burbank, California
Musicians from Burbank, California